Zhongning County is a county under the administration of Zhongwei city in west-central Ningxia Hui Autonomous Region of the People's Republic of China, bordering Inner Mongolia to the northwest. It is the point at which the northern twist of the Yellow River begins, creating the Ordos Loop.

Zhongning County is an agricultural county. In addition to traditional agricultural products, Wolfberries have begun to be cultivated in recent years. However, due to a drought, the growing range for the berries has not significantly increased. The county government is located in the town of Ningan and the county's postal code is 755100.

Administrative divisions
Zhongning County has 6 towns and 6 townships.
6 towns
 Ning′an
 Enhe
 Xinbao
 Shikong
 Mingsha
 Dazhanchang

6 townships
 Xutao
 Hanjiaoshu
 Yuding
 Baima
 Zhouta
 Taiyangliang

Climate

References

 
County-level divisions of Ningxia
Zhongwei